The 56th United States Colored Infantry was an infantry regiment that served in the Union Army during the American Civil War. The regiment was composed of African American enlisted men commanded by white officers and was authorized by the Bureau of Colored Troops which was created by the United States War Department on May 22, 1863.  The regiment was originally organized as the 3rd Arkansas Volunteer Infantry (African Descent) on May 22, 1863.

Organization
The regiment was organized at St. Louis in August 1863 as the 3rd Regiment Arkansas Volunteer Infantry (African Descent) and assigned to the VII Corps (Union Army). The regiment was dispatched to Helena, Arkansas, where it was initially utilized for garrison and guard duty. The regiment was re-organized at Helena, Arkansas, on March 11, 1864, and re-designated the 56th United States Colored Infantry. The 56th was commanded by Col. Carl Bentzoni, a Prussian born officer who trained the troops for combat.

Service
The 3rd Regiment Arkansas Volunteer Infantry (African Descent) participated in the Expedition from Helena up White River February 4–8, 1864. and up St. Francis River February 13–14.

On July 26, 1864, near Wallace's Ferry in Arkansas, the unit (now re-designated as the 56th United States Colored Infantry Regiment), along with the 60th Colored Infantry regiments and Battery E of the 2nd U.S. Colored Artillery were attacked by a superior force of Confederate cavalry commanded by Col. Archibald S. Dobbins. Supported by about 150 men from the 15th Illinois Cavalry, the infantry regiments organized a fighting retreat and at a crucial moment in the battle made a counter charge into the enemy line. The unit was praised by the commander of Battery E in his after action report:.

Colonel Brooks of the 56th was mortally wounded early in the action and Lieutenant Colonel Moses Reed assumed command. The 56th and the other Union forces made their way back to Helena. Union casualties in the battle were 19 killed, 40 wounded, and four missing. Confederate losses are unknown.

General Order No. 14, Department of Arkansas (dated February 1, 1865), from Little Rock, reported the 56th United States Colored Infantry as belonging to the 2nd Brigade of the 1st Division of the 7th Army Corps.

The 56th Colored Regiment losses during service consisted of: four officers and 21 enlisted men killed or mortally wounded; and two officers and 647 enlisted men by disease; for a total of 674 fatalities. The vast majority of the deaths due to disease occurred during a cholera epidemic that struck in August 1866 while the regiment was waiting to muster out at Jefferson Barracks Military Post near St. Louis. One hundred seventy-five African American enlisted men of the 56th U.S. Colored Infantry are buried together in a mass grave at Jefferson Barracks National Cemetery.

Mustered out of service
Mustered out September 15, 1866.

The U.S. government credits 5,526 men of African descent as having served in the Union Army from the state of Arkansas during the conflict.

See also

 List of Arkansas Civil War Union units
 List of United States Colored Troops Civil War Units
 United States Colored Troops

Notes

References

 Robertson, Brian K. "Will They Fight? Ask the Enemy:" United States Colored Troops at Big Creek, Arkansas, July 26, 1864; Arkansas Historical Quarterly; Vol. 66; Autumn 2007; Pp 320–332.
 https://www.loc.gov/pictures/item/2010647218/

External links
 The War of the Rebellion: a Compilation of the Official Records of the Union and Confederate Armies
 The Arkansas History Commission, State Archives, Civil War in Arkansas

United States Colored Troops Civil War units and formations
Units and formations of the Union Army from Arkansas
Military units and formations established in 1863
1863 establishments in Arkansas
Military units and formations disestablished in 1866